is a tram station operated by Tokyo Metropolitan Bureau of Transportation's  Tokyo Sakura Tram located in Arakawa, Tokyo, Japan. It is 4.1 kilometres from the terminus of the Tokyo Sakura Tram at Minowabashi Station.

Layout
Arakawa-yuenchimae Station has two opposed side platforms.

Surrounding area
 Arakawa-Yuen
 Sumida River
 Oku Station ( Utsunomiya and Takasaki Lines)

History
 April 1, 1913: Station opened

Railway stations in Tokyo
Railway stations in Japan opened in 1913
Arakawa, Tokyo